Omorgus inflatus is a beetle of the family Trogidae.

References 

inflatus
Beetles described in 1922